Flamets-Frétils is a commune in the Seine-Maritime department in the Normandy region in northern France.

Geography
The A29 autoroute passes through the commune's territory.

Population

Places of interest
 The chapel of Saint-Laurent at Frétils, dating from the eighteenth century.
 The eighteenth century church of Saint-Valéry at the hamlet of Sausseuzemare.
 The eleventh century chapel of Notre-Dame at the hamlet of Port-Mort.
 The church of St.Pierre at Flaments, dating from the twelfth century.

See also
Communes of the Seine-Maritime department

References

Communes of Seine-Maritime